Ohio's 2nd congressional district is a district in southern Ohio.  It is currently represented by Republican Brad Wenstrup.

The district includes all of Adams, Brown, Pike, Clermont, Highland, Clinton, Ross, Pickaway, Hocking, Vinton, Jackson, Gallia, Meigs, Lawrence, and Scioto counties, as well as parts of Fayette.

List of members representing the district

Election results
The following chart shows historic election results.

2005 special election

The district has not elected a Democrat since Tom Luken won a 1974 special election.

On August 2, 2005, elections were held to choose a United States representative to replace Rob Portman, who resigned his seat on April 29, 2005, to become United States Trade Representative. Republican Jean Schmidt candidate defeated Democrat Paul Hackett in a surprisingly close election.

Re-election bid in 2006

Schmidt defeated Democrat Victoria Wells Wulsin, a doctor from Indian Hill, in the November general election.

2010

2012

2014

2016

2018

2020

2022

Competitiveness
Election results from presidential races:

Historical district boundaries

See also
Ohio's congressional districts
List of United States congressional districts

Notes

References

 Congressional Biographical Directory of the United States 1774–present

02
Constituencies established in 1813
1813 establishments in Ohio